The 1925 Charlevoix–Kamouraska earthquake struck northeastern North America on February 28, reaching 6.2 on the moment magnitude scale. It was one of the most powerful measured in Canada in the 20th century, with a maximum perceived intensity of VIII (Severe) on the Mercalli intensity scale at its epicentre in the area of Charlevoix-Kamouraska along the Saint Lawrence River near île aux Lièvres and not greater than VI (Strong) in the United States.  The quake was felt in Quebec City, Shawinigan, Montreal, as far south as Virginia, and as far west as the Mississippi River.

Damage
It caused damage in three separate areas. In this area, damage at the villages of Baie-Saint-Paul, Saint-Urbain, Les Éboulements, Pointe-au-Pic, La Malbaie, Tadoussac and the other nearby villages of Sainte-Anne-de-la-Pocatière, Saint-Pacôme, Rivière-Ouelle, Saint-Philippe, Saint-Denis, and Saint-Pascal on the south shore, was mostly related to the magnitude of the earthquake itself, and to some extent by the deep grainy soil on which many of the destroyed buildings were built. The two other damaged areas were Quebec City and in the Trois-Rivières – Shawinigan area, where the destruction was more extensive, not so much due to the strength of the earthquake, but rather to the uneven nature of the landscape.

Aftermath
A total of 55 aftershocks were recorded, which lasted for weeks, ranging from magnitude 5 to 2. Over the years, several studies were published on the 1925 Charlevoix–Kamouraska earthquake, some as recently as 1999. A foreshock occurred in the St. Lawrence valley the prior year on September 30. It was rated at 6.1 and was felt from Rockland, Ontario to Portland, Maine.

See also
Charlevoix Seismic Zone
List of earthquakes in 1925
List of earthquakes in Canada
List of earthquakes in the United States

References

Bibliography

External links

1925 earthquakes
1925 in Quebec
1925 Charlevoix-Kamouraska
1925 Charlevoix-Kamouraska
1925 Charlevoix-Kamouraska
February 1925 events